Trichilia ramalhoi is a species of plant in the family Meliaceae. It is endemic to Brazil.

References

ramalhoi
Endemic flora of Brazil
Vulnerable flora of South America
Taxonomy articles created by Polbot